Jean-Marie Bigard (born 17 May 1954) is a French comedian and actor. Known for his often controversial humour, he has performed at some of the largest entertainment facilities in France, including the Paris-Bercy Arena and Stade de France. Bigard is a close friend of former French President Nicolas Sarkozy, whom he accompanied on an official visit to Pope Benedict XVI in Rome.

Personal life 

Jean-Marie Bigard married Claudia Bigard in February 1991. The couple have one child, Sasha, born on 19 June 2009. They divorced in August 2009. He then married the comedian Lola Marois in May 2011. They are the parents of twins, Jules, 
Florian Jourda and Bella. Marois defends his right to speak freely.

Theater

Filmography

Radio
 From 2014 to 2016 : Les pieds dans le plat on Europe 1

Others 
He was one of the contestants during the First season of Danse avec les stars. With his partner Fauve Hautot, he finished in the 5th position.
This table shows the route of Jean-Marie Bigard and Fauve Hautot in Danse Avec Les Stars.

Views on the September 11 attacks 

In September 2008, Bigard claimed that the September 11 attacks on the US seven years earlier were an "enormous lie" orchestrated by the American government. He said that he was "absolutely sure and certain" that the US government had stage-managed the attacks.

Later, in a statement to Agence France-Presse, Bigard said that he wanted to "apologise to everyone". He also said: "I will never speak again about the events of 11 September... I will never express any more doubts." He stopped short, however, of saying that he accepted that his comments were untrue.

In June 2009, Bigard posted several videos on his website in which he comments on the official account of the September 11 attacks.

On 28 October 2009, accompanied by Mathieu Kassovitz, Bigard participated on a TV show (France 2) in which he said there was no proof of Bin Laden's culpability in the attacks, neither any images (and proof) about an airplane crashing on the Pentagon.

References

External links 
Official site

French stand-up comedians
1954 births
French humorists
Living people
People from Troyes
Male actors from Los Angeles
People from New York (state)
French male writers
9/11 conspiracy theorists
French conspiracy theorists
20th-century French male writers